Events from the year 1817 in Germany.

Incumbents

Kingdoms 
 Kingdom of Prussia
 Monarch – Frederick William III of Prussia (16 November 1797 – 7 June 1840)
 Kingdom of Bavaria
 Maximilian I (1 January 1806 – 13 October 1825)
 Kingdom of Saxony
 Frederick Augustus I (20 December 1806 – 5 May 1827)
 Kingdom of Hanover
 George III (25 October 1760 – 29 January 1820)
 Kingdom of Württemberg
 William (30 October 1816 – 25 June 1864)

Grand Duchies 
 Grand Duke of Baden
Charles 10 June 1811 – 8 December 1818
 Grand Duke of Hesse
 Louis I (14 August 1806 – 6 April 1830)
 Grand Duke of Mecklenburg-Schwerin
 Frederick Francis I– (24 April 1785 – 1 February 1837)
 Grand Duke of Mecklenburg-Strelitz
 George (6 November 1816 – 6 September 1860)
 Grand Duke of Oldenburg
 Wilhelm (6 July 1785 – 2 July 1823 ) Due to mental illness, Wilhelm was duke in name only, with his cousin Peter, Prince-Bishop of Lübeck, acting as regent throughout his entire reign.
 Peter I (2 July 1823 – 21 May 1829)
 Grand Duke of Saxe-Weimar-Eisenach
 Charles Frederick (14 June 1828 – 8 July 1853)

Principalities 
 Schaumburg-Lippe
 George William (13 February 1787 - 1860)
 Schwarzburg-Rudolstadt
 Friedrich Günther (28 April 1807 – 28 June 1867)
 Schwarzburg-Sondershausen
 Günther Friedrich Karl I (14 October 1794 – 19 August 1835)
 Principality of Lippe
 Leopold II (5 November 1802 – 1 January 1851)
 Principality of Reuss-Greiz
Heinrich XIII (28 June 1800 – 29 January 1817)
 Heinrich XIX (29 January 1817 – 31 October 1836)
 Waldeck and Pyrmont
 George II (9 September 1813 – 15 May 1845)

Duchies 
 Duke of Anhalt-Dessau
Leopold III (16 December 1751 – 9 August 1817)
 Leopold IV (9 August 1817 – 22 May 1871)
 Duke of Brunswick
 Charles II (16 June 1815 – 9 September 1830)
 Duke of Saxe-Altenburg
 Duke of Saxe-Hildburghausen (1780–1826)  - Frederick
 Duke of Saxe-Coburg and Gotha
 Ernest I (9 December 1806 – 12 November 1826)
 Duke of Saxe-Meiningen
 Bernhard II (24 December 1803 – 20 September 1866)
 Duke of Schleswig-Holstein-Sonderburg-Beck
 Frederick William (25 March 1816 – 6 July 1825)

Events 
 12 June – German inventor Karl Drais drives his dandy horse ("Draisine" or Laufmaschine), the earliest form of bicycle, in Mannheim.
 18 October – Wartburg Festival

Births 
 22 February – Carl Wilhelm Borchardt, German mathematician (d. 1880)
 14 September – Theodor Storm, German writer (d. 1888)
 30 October – Hermann Franz Moritz Kopp, German chemist (d. 1892)
 30 November – Theodor Mommsen, German writer, Nobel Prize laureate (d. 1903)

Deaths 
 1 January – Martin Heinrich Klaproth, German chemist who discovered uranium (1789), zirconium (1789), and cerium (1803) (b. 1743)
 2 April – Johann Heinrich Jung, German writer (b. 1740)
 30 June – Abraham Gottlob Werner, German geologist (b. 1750)
 10 August – Leopold III, Duke of Anhalt-Dessau
 1 December – Justin Heinrich Knecht, German composer, organist and music theorist (b. 1752)

References 

Years of the 19th century in Germany
1817 in Germany
Germany
Germany